Viktor Yefimovich Slesarev (5 August 1949 – 14 July 2022) was a Russian football player and manager.

References

External links 
 

1949 births
2022 deaths
Soviet footballers
Association football defenders
FC Neftyanik Ufa players
FC SKA-Khabarovsk players
FC Zvezda Perm players
FK Köpetdag Aşgabat players
Soviet football managers
Russian football managers